is a Japanese former judoka who competed in the 1972 Summer Olympics.

References

1947 births
Living people
Japanese male judoka
Olympic judoka of Japan
Judoka at the 1972 Summer Olympics
Olympic bronze medalists for Japan
Olympic medalists in judo
Medalists at the 1972 Summer Olympics
Universiade medalists in judo
Universiade gold medalists for Japan
Medalists at the 1967 Summer Universiade
20th-century Japanese people
21st-century Japanese people